The Kaiser (K) is a unit of energy.  A common form is kiloKaiser (kK).  1 kK = 1000 cm−1.  ( cm−1, wavenumber or inverse wavelength.)  This unit is most commonly used with respect to energy transitions between electronic states in inorganic complexes.

See also
Wavenumber

Kilokaiser is a common but incorrect spelling of the unit KiloKayser, which equals 1000 wavenumber (cm−1).  The unit is named after Heinrich Gustav Johannes Kayser (16 March 1853 – 14 October 1940), a German physicist.

References
Scarlata, Suzanne; Rakesh Gupta; et al. Biochemistry, Vol. 35, No. 47, 1996
Fuguet, Elisabet; Carla Ráfols; et al. Langmuir, Vol. 19, No. 1, 2003
Douglas, Bodie; Darl McDaniel; and John Alexander. Concepts and Models of Inorganic Chemistry. 3rd ed. John Wiley & Sons, Inc. New York. 1994.

Units of energy